The Statistics Online Computational Resource (SOCR) is an online multi-institutional research and education organization. SOCR designs, validates and broadly shares a suite of online tools for statistical computing, and interactive materials for hands-on learning and teaching concepts in data science, statistical analysis and probability theory. The SOCR resources are platform agnostic based on HTML, XML and Java, and all materials, tools and services are freely available over the Internet.

The core SOCR components include interactive distribution calculators, statistical analysis modules, tools for data modeling, graphics visualization, instructional resources, learning activities and other resources.

All SOCR resources are LGPL/CC-BY licensed, peer-reviewed, integrated internally and interoperate with independent digital libraries developed by other professional societies and scientific organizations like NSDL, Open Educational Resources, Mathematical Association of America, California Digital Library, LONI Pipeline, etc.

See also
 List of statistical packages
 Comparison of statistical packages

External links
 SOCR University of Michigan site
 SOCR UCLA site

References

Educational math software
Research institutes in the United States
Statistical software
University of Michigan